George Harold Ryton (born 15 August 1948 in Singapore) is a British engineer best known for his involvement in Formula One auto racing.

Career 
When the team was disbanded, he moved to Reynard to help design the company's first Formula 3000 chassis. Soon afterwards, he moved to the design centre of John Barnard, who was Ferrari's Technical Director at the time.

Ryton returned to work for Barnard, who had briefly moved to work for Benetton but was now back at Ferrari.  On this occasion, Ryton's job was slightly different, as he was put in charge of the team's drawing office at its Maranello base.  He remained in this position until mid-, when he accepted the position of Technical Director at the small Forti team.

After working on the FG03 chassis, Ryton was left without a job when the team folded mid-season.  However, he was soon appointed Head of Research and Development at the Ligier team, which was bought by former F1 champion Alain Prost soon afterwards and took his name.  In , the Prost AP01's unreliable and heavy gearbox saw him fall from favour and he moved to Minardi.

Having left F1, Ryton now works as an independent consultant in Cornwall.

References 

 

Living people
1948 births
Ferrari people
Formula One designers
British motorsport people